In Economics, an occupational choice model is a model that seeks to answer why people enter into different occupations 
.

In the model, in each moment, the person decides whether to work as in the previous occupation, in some other occupation, or not to be employed. In some versions of the model, an individual chooses that occupation for which the present value of his expected income is a maximum. However, in other versions, risk aversion may drive people to work in the same occupation as before.

References

Occupations
Economics models